Acheson may refer to:

Acheson, Alberta, a locality and industrial area in Alberta, Canada
Acheson (surname), people with the surname Acheson
Acheson Irvine (1837-1916), Canadian policeman

See also
Atchison (disambiguation)